The Women's 48 kg weightlifting event was the lightest women's event at the competition, limiting competitors to a maximum of 48 kilograms of body mass. The competition took place on 4 October at 14:00 and was the first Weightlifting event to conclude. The event took place at the Jawaharlal Nehru Stadium.
Nigerian Augustina Nwaokolo won the first gold medal of the Games, setting a new Games record of 175 kg after lifting 77 kg in the snatch and 98 kg in the clean and jerk.

Athletes
10 lifters were selected for the games.

Results

References

See also 
2010 Commonwealth Games
Weightlifting at the 2010 Commonwealth Games

Weightlifting at the 2010 Commonwealth Games
Common